George Washington High School is a public high school in Richmond District, San Francisco, California. In 2011, Washington High was ranked by Newsweek's Jay Mathews Challenge Index as the 497th best high school in the United States.

History

George Washington High School opened on August 4, 1936 to serve as a secondary school for the people of San Francisco’s Richmond District. The school was built on a budget of $8,000,000, on a site overlooking the Golden Gate Bridge. The stadium, auditorium, and gymnasium were added in 1940. The school was formally dedicated on Armistice Day 1940.

The lobby is decorated with murals by Victor Arnautoff titled Life of Washington that were commissioned by the Works Progress Administration in 1936 as part of Franklin Delano Roosevelt's New Deal projects for public buildings. A student of Diego Rivera, Arnautoff made the murals in the "buon fresco" style, depicting scenes from the life of George Washington. Intended to teach students about the realities of history, the murals include representations of Black slaves and white indentured servants on Washington's estate. Another mural criticizes the notion of Manifest Destiny and has been criticized for its allegorical depiction of a prostrate Native American. In June 2019, the school board voted to remove the murals.

In 1981 the Pacific News Service aired a story about race-based gangs at George Washington High School.

In season five, episode five (1976) of the TV series The Streets of San Francisco, Maureen McCormick plays a teenage hooker attending the school. Two scenes show the school and its view of the Golden Gate Bridge.

Demographics
2020-2021

According to U.S. News & World Report, 92% of Washington's student body is "of color," with 62% of the student body coming from an economically disadvantaged household, determined by student eligibility for California's reduced-price meal program.

Location

600 32nd Ave, San Francisco, California

George Washington High School's campus is located kitty-corner to Presidio Middle School, also a public school.

Facilities include:
3-story academic building
2-story shop building
Auditorium/Theater
Computer Labs
Library
Gymnasium
Track and field
2 Batting cages
Front Toss cage
Bullpen
American football field/Soccer Field
 Soccer/multipurpose field
6 tennis courts
3 full-sized basketball courts
1 half-sized basketball court

Academics
In 2011, Newsweek ranked George Washington as the 497th best high school in America.  The curriculum includes a variety of advanced Visual Performing Arts classes including: Dance Company, Ceramics, Vocal Music, Band and Orchestra, Computer Art and AP Art and Design.  There is a computer lab and a Computer Science pathway, plus courses in Robotics.  Washington is one of only two San Francisco public high schools with a Marching Band, the other being Phillip & Sala Burton High School.

The school is a Newcomer Pathway school that serves recently arrived students from all over the world, primarily from those from China and Latin America.  There is also an extensive program for special needs students who comprise about 10% of the student population.

Sports
The George Washington High athletic program is governed by the Academic Athletic Association (AAA) and is sanctioned by the California Interscholastic Federation (CIF).

George Washington High School supports 20 varsity, 7 junior varsity, and frosh-soph programs.  It is the only San Francisco public high school with Girls and Boys Lacrosse teams.

Sports offered include Cross Country, Tennis Girls, Football, Soccer Boys, Volleyball Boys, Golf Girls, Volleyball Girls, Wrestling, Swimming, Badminton, Baseball, Fencing, Softball, Basketball, Boys Lacrosse, Girls Lacrosse, Golf Boys, Tennis Boys, Soccer Girls, Track & Field, and as Cheerleading.

Recent League Championships
2022-2023 All City Wrestling Champions

2021-2022 Varsity Boys Baseball Champions

2021-2022 All City Wrestling Champions

2019-2020 Girls Varsity Basketball Champions

2015-2016 Boys Varsity Volleyball Champions

2014-2015 Boys Varsity Volleyball Champions

2014-2015 Boys Varsity Golf Champions

2013-2014 Varsity Boys Baseball Runner-Up

2013-2014 JV Girls Basketball City Champions

2012-2013 Frosh-Soph Boys Basketball Champions

2012-2013 Varsity Softball Runner-up

2012-2013 Varsity Boys Baseball Runner-up

2011-2012 Varsity Boys Baseball Trans Bay Champions

2011-2012 Varsity Boys Baseball Champions

2011-2012 Varsity Softball Runner-up

2011-2012 All City Wrestling Champions

2011-2012 Varsity Boys Football Runner-up

2010-2011 Varsity Boys Baseball Champions

2010-2011 Varsity Boys Basketball Champions

2010-2011 Varsity Boys Football Champions

2010-2011 Varsity Girls Golf Runner-up

2009-2010 Varsity Softball Trans Bay Champions

2009-2010 Varsity Softball Champions

2009-2010 All City Badminton Champions

2009-2010 Varsity Girls Soccer Runner-up

2009-2010 All City Wrestling Champions

2009-2010 Varsity Girls Tennis Runner-up

2008-2009 Varsity Boys Golf Champions

2008-2009 JV Boys Basketball Champions

2008-2009 Varsity Boys Baseball Champions

2008-2009 Varsity Softball Runner-up

2008-2009 All City Badminton Runner-up

2008-2009 All City Wrestling Champions

2007-2008 JV Boys Baseball City Champions

2007-2008 Varsity Boys Swimming Champions

2007-2008 Varsity Softball Runner-up

2007-2008 All City Badminton Runner-up

2007-2008 Varsity Boys Golf Champions

2007-2008 JV Girls Basketball City Champions

2007-2008 All City Wrestling Champions

2006-2007 Varsity Boys Swimming Champions

2006-2007 JV Boys Baseball City Champions

2006-2007 All City Badminton Runner-up

2006-2007 Varsity Boys Tennis Runner-up

2006-2007 Varsity Boys Golf Runner-up

2006-2007 Track & Field Runner-up

2005-2007 Varsity Baseball Transbay champions

2005-2006 Varsity Baseball City Champions

2005-2006 Varsity Boys Volleyball Champions

2004-2005 Fencing City Champions

2003-2004 Varsity Football Champions

2001-2006 5 in a row Softball All City Champions

2001-2002 All City Badminton Champions

2000-2001 Varsity Football Champions

2000-2001 Varsity Baseball Champions

2000-2001 All City Badminton Champions

1999-2000 Varsity Football Champions

1999-2001 Varsity Girls Basketball Champions

1995 Varsity Boys' Volleyball 2nd Place

Source

Washington Hymn
The Washington Hymn is the official song of George Washington High School. It was written by student Tillie Miesles, class of 1937.

Notable alumni

 Diane Amos, Pine-Sol lady
 Maya Angelou, author and poet, awarded the Spingarn Medal, the National Medal of Arts, and the Presidential Medal of Freedom
 Marty Balin, former lead singer of the Jefferson Starship
 Josiah Beeman, US Ambassador
 Gene Brown, basketball player
 Phillip Burton, Congressman
 Rosemary Casals, professional tennis player
 Ann Curtis, Three time USA swimming medalist, 1948 Summer Olympics, winning two Golds in the 400 meter freestyle & 4 X 100 freestyle relay, and a Silver in the 100 meter freestyle
 Dorothy Delasin, golfer
 Keith Fowler, actor, director, producer, educator
 Danny Glover, actor
 Ross Giudice, basketball player & coach
 Steve Gray, basketball player
 Richard Hongisto, politician
 Serhiy Kandaurov, footballer
Leo Krupnik (born 1979), Ukrainian-born American-Israeli former soccer player and current soccer coach
 Rachel Kushner, writer, novelist
 Amanda Lassiter, basketball player in the WNBA
 Marcio Lassiter, basketball player in the Philippines
 Gilman Louie, technologist
 Richard Lui, news anchor for MSNBC
 Alec Mapa, writer, comedian and actor
 Hal March, 1950s television personality
 Del Martin, lesbian activist
 Johnny Mathis, singer, Grammy Lifetime Achievement Award
 Ollie Matson, member of College and Pro Football Halls of Fame, Olympic gold and bronze medalist
 Sean McGrath, musician, artist
 Lee Meriwether, model, actress, and Miss America
 Nathan Oliveira, artist
 Betty Ong, flight attendant on 9/11 jet American Airlines Flight 11
 San Quinn, rap artist
 John Rothmann, talk radio host
 Jim Sochor, former college football head coach, UC Davis (1970-1988).
 Phil Smith, NBA player
 Gregg Turkington, comedian
 Paul Vixie, internet pioneer (sendmail, BIND and PAIX)
 Martin Wong, artist
 Al Young (dragster driver), world champion drag racer
 Connie Young Yu, writer, historian, lecturer

Arnautoff murals controversy

In June 2019 the San Francisco Unified School District Board of Education voted to destroy 13 murals made in 1936 by Victor Arnautoff for the George Washington High School, a Works Progress Administration project funded through New Deal support for unemployed artists during the Great Depression.
The works have come under criticism for the realistic depiction of the African-American slaves and white indentured servants that George Washington had on his Mount Vernon estate.
Another mural, intended as a criticism of Manifest Destiny, depicts in an allegorical manner four pioneers who tread over and beside a dead Native American. In 1974 the school added three murals by artist Dewey Crumpler to assuage complaints and Crumpler argues that the students at that time issued an apology for failing to understand the meaning of the works and the devices used by Arnautoff to convey the realities of history. The proposed destruction has received national attention.

Preservation of the murals has garnered broad support.
The College Art Association has supported the murals, and an open letter demanding the preservation of the murals was signed by 400 prominent scholars and artists, including Wendy Brown, Judith Butler, T.J. Clark, Jodi Dean, Carol Duncan, Nancy Fraser, Hal Foster, Michael Fried, David Harvey, Andrew Hemingway, Fredric Jameson, Joyce Kozloff, Lucy Lippard, Walter Benn Michaels, Adolph Reed Jr., Martha Rosler, Anne M. Wagner, Allan Wallach as well as Rocco Landesman, former Chairman for the National Endowment for the Arts.

San Francisco Heritage, a non-profit devoted to preserving the city's artistic and architectural legacy, proposed the school be designated a historic landmark on the basis of this and other features.

Alice Walker, whose daughter attended the school, suggested that explanations be added to provide context: “If you cover things up, the danger is that you will end up in the same place again, and you won’t even recognize it.” Robert W. Cherny, an authority on the work of Arnautoff, argued at a 2018 SFUSD Board of Education meeting that Arnautoff was very consciously representing slavery and genocide in an effort to counter the storybook representations of Washington that students were taught in the 1930s.

The school's Alumni Association supports the murals, as do the majority of students. Among the other groups who defend the murals are the California College of the Arts, the San Francisco Art Institute, the United Public Workers for Action, the National New Deal Preservation Association, and the National Coalition Against Censorship. On September 24, 2021, the San Francisco Superior Court determined that the SFUSD School Board had violated California environmental law and required that the School Board void its unlawful actions to destroy or cover over the historic Arnautoff murals.

See also

 San Francisco County high schools

References

External links
 George Washington High School Online, School Website
 George Washington High School Alumni Association, Alumni Association Website
 WPA murals and sculpture at George Washington High School, from the New Deal Art Registry
George Washington High School History Website 

Public high schools in San Francisco
San Francisco Unified School District schools
Richmond District, San Francisco
Educational institutions established in 1936
1936 establishments in California